Kevin Yi is a Chinese lyricist. He has been nominated for Best Lyricist in the Golden Melody Awards, and has worked alongside a number of notable artists, including Stefanie Sun, JJ Lin, Coco Lee, Chief Zhao and Yida Huang. Yi is currently employed as an exclusive writer at Warner Chappell Music.

Career

Early career 
Kevin started to write his first lyrics as a student, and would always carry a notebook with him to keep his writing ideas. In his early career in the music industry, he joined the Marketing department of Rock Records in Taiwan. Kevin's first project was Chief Zhao's “A Tiny Bird” (我是一隻小小鳥).

Kevin then moved on to serving as an A&R, and later joined BMG Music as the Marketing and Promotion Director. At the same time, he published numerous lyrics that became popular tracks.

Songwriting 
Kevin wrote the lyrics for the Chinese version of “A Love Before Time”, the theme song for the Academy Award and Golden Globe Award-winning film Crouching Tiger, Hidden Dragon. This song was performed by Coco Lee and featured Yo-Yo Ma on cello. It was also nominated for Best Original Song at the Academy Awards.

During his time serving as the Marketing Director at Warner Music, Kevin made major contributions to the successful debut of artists like Stefanie Sun and Yida Huang. He has already accumulated many notable works at this point, including Leehom Wang's “Forever's First Day永遠的第一天” and A-Mei's “Remember記得”.

Over the years, Kevin has written numerous popular tracks, including Stefanie Sun's “Kite風箏”, “Love Dictionary愛情字典”, “Someone Like Me 同類”, “Encounter遇見”, F.I.R's “Crescent Bay月牙灣”, and Khalil Fong's “Fu Ke Hui Yi復刻回憶”. The song Kevin wrote for JJ Lin in 2013, “Practice Love修煉愛情”, won Hito Pop Music Best 10 Singles, and Singapore Hit Awards Best 10 Singles.

He has published over 1,000 Mandarin songs written for various artists from Hong Kong and Taiwan, such as Terry Lin, Stefanie Sun, Jackie Chan, Jolin Tsai, Shirley Kwan, Eric Suen, Hacken Lee, Jordan Chan, Sam Lee, Karen Mok, F4, 4 in Love, Kelly Chen, Hins Cheung, Evonne Hsu, Fish Leong, Rachel Liang, Eason Chan, A-Mei, Tanya Chua, Joi Chua, Winnie Hsin, JJ Lin, Leehom Wang, Will Pan, Andy Lau, Sandy Lam, Yida Huang, S.H.E, Yoga Lin, Victor Wong, Cyndi Wang, Kay Tse, Jacky Cheung, Sammi Cheng, Rainie Yang, Vivian Hsu, Valen Hsu, Wan Fang, Joey Yung, Julia Peng, Gigi Leung, Rene Liu, Anita Mui, Leo Ku, Tiger Huang, Aaron Kwok, Van Fan, Twins, Nicholas Tse and others.

Current career 
Kevin continues to play various roles in the Chinese music industry. His recent works include Eason Chan's “Soar披風”, JJ Lin's “53 Dawns黑夜問白天”, Amei and Sandy Lam's “Double Shadow雙影” (song from drama “Ruyi's Royal Love in the Palace”), and Mayday vocalist Ashin cover of Joi Chua's song “The Hidden Memories 隱形的紀念” (song for the exhibition “Where have all the flowers gone?”)

Artistry

Style 
Due to his Marketing background, Kevin knows how to customize lyrics for singers. Some of Kevin's work has benefited their singers to rise to prominence, including James Li's “Man on Wire” (走鋼索的人)、Jordan Chan's  “God, Save me” (神啊 救救我), Stefanie Sun's “Encounter” (遇見), and JJ Lin's “Practice Love” (修煉愛情).

In his lyrics, Kevin also likes to illustrate scenarios in people's daily lives. He can help listeners connect deeply to the song and guide them to construct a whole image in their minds that is unique to them by using fragments of situations that everyone recognizes.

Works

Awards and recognition 
With his lyrics 地下鐵 (Singer: 鍾漢良, Composer: 邰正宵), Kevin was nominated for the Best Lyricist Award in the 10th Golden Melody Award, 1999.

References 

Living people
Chinese lyricists
Year of birth missing (living people)